The 1966 National Challenge Cup was the 53rd edition of the USSFA's annual open soccer championship. The Philadelphia Ukrainians defeated the Orange County Soccer Club to win.

Final

References
 

Lamar Hunt U.S. Open Cup
U.S. Open Cup